Quatro Rodas is an automotive monthly magazine from Brazil, published by Editora Abril.

History
Quatro Rodas was founded by Editora Abril's general director Victor Civita in August 1960. The magazine test drove their first car, which was a DKW Belcar, in August 1961.

References

1960 establishments in Brazil
Automobile magazines
Magazines published in Brazil
Monthly magazines published in Brazil
Grupo Abril
Magazines established in 1960
Portuguese-language magazines